MacNeil Mitchell (July 18, 1904 – December 17, 1996) was an American lawyer and Republican politician from New York.

Life
He was born on July 18, 1904, in Lime Rock, Litchfield County, Connecticut, the son of George Henry Mitchell and Harriet (MacNeil) Mitchell. He graduated from Yale College in 1926; attended Columbia Law School, and graduated from UC Berkeley School of Law in 1929. He practiced law in New York City. In 1938, he married Katherine McGowin, and they had three children.

Mitchell was a member of the New York State Assembly from 1938 to 1946, sitting in the 161st, 162nd, 163rd, 164th and 165th New York State Legislatures.

He was a member of the New York State Senate (20th district) from 1947 to 1964, sitting in the 166th, 167th, 168th, 169th, 170th, 171st, 172nd, 173rd and 174th New York State Legislatures; and was Chairman of the Committee on the Judiciary in 1963 and 1964.

He was a delegate to the 1960 and 1964 Republican National Conventions.

He died on December 17, 1996, in Cornell Medical Center in Manhattan, of pneumonia; and was buried at the Salisbury Cemetery in Salisbury, Connecticut.

U.S. Patent Commissioner Charles Elliott Mitchell (1837–1911) was his grandfather.

Sources

1904 births
1996 deaths
People from Salisbury, Connecticut
Republican Party New York (state) state senators
People from Manhattan
Republican Party members of the New York State Assembly
Deaths from pneumonia in New York City
UC Berkeley School of Law alumni
Yale College alumni
Columbia Law School alumni
20th-century American politicians